The Empire Nephrite (sometimes mistakenly referred to as the Alexander III Medallion) egg is a jewelled Easter egg, purported to be one of the Imperial Eggs made under the supervision of the Russian jeweller Peter Carl Fabergé in 1901–1902 for Nicholas II of Russia, who presented it to his mother, the Dowager Empress Maria Feodorovna, at Easter 1902. This provenance has been challenged by some Fabergé experts.

History

The name of the egg refers to the fact that it was made in the Empire Style, from nephrite. The original Fabergé invoice reads: "Egg, 'Empire', from nephrite, with gold, two diamonds and miniature". The egg reappeared in the mid-1990s and some Fabergé researchers were of the mistaken opinion that this egg featured a portrait medallion of Alexander III of Russia, though the original bill did not refer to a portrait of Alexander III.

This mistake was result of a misinterpretation of the Moscow Armory Chamber valuables selection list. This list noted an "Egg from nephrite, on a golden base, and with portrait of the Emperor Alexander III in a medallion". Because of this, many researchers were certain that the 1902 Imperial egg featured an Alexander III portrait, though there is no evidence to support this.

However, in 2015, during research by a specially commissioned group of experts, a unique historical document was brought to the attention of the experts – the "List of the personal property of the Dowager Empress Maria Feodorovna, located in storage at Gatchina Palace" by 28 July 1917. This 12-page booklet mentions at least 150 items, including 7 Imperial Fabergé eggs that belonged to the Dowager Empress Maria Feodorovna. This document was first published in 2013.

On the second page of this document, as number 10, there is a description "Egg with gold mounts, on two nephrite columns, with portraits of Gr. Dss. Olga Alexandrovna and Duke P.A. Oldenburg inside". This description is the most accurate that Fabergé researchers have to date concerning the egg of 1902, which was previously mistaken for an "Egg from nephrite, on a gold base and with portrait of the Emperor Alexander III in a medallion". 
 	
The egg is currently in a private collection in New York, USA.

Disputed provenance 
The egg's authenticity is disputed by some Fabergé experts, who believe the Empire Nephrite egg is still lost or missing. Other experts, such as Fabergé specialist Geza von Habsburg, the ex-Forbes Collection’s Carol Aiken, Sotheby’s Karen Kettering, and Wartski Director Kieran McCarthy (who in 2014 authenticated the Third Imperial egg when it was found after being lost for 90 years) have examined the egg and have not made any public statement to authenticate it.

See also
Egg decorating
List of missing treasure

References

External links

 Tatiana Fabergé, Nikolai Bachmakov, Dmitry Krivoshey, Nicholas B.A. Nicholson (ed.), Valentin Skurlov, Anna Palmade, Vincent Palmade. Fabergé: The Imperial “Empire” Egg of 1902. — New York. — 2017. P. 364 
 (RU) Т. Фаберже, Н. Башмаков, Д. Кривошей (сост.), Н. Никольсон, А. и В. Палмейд, В. Скурлов. Фаберже. Императорское пасхальное яйцо «Ампир» 1902 года. М.: ООО «Буки Веди», 2018. 160 с. 
Mieks Fabergé Eggs

1902 works
Imperial Fabergé eggs